The Tennessee Smokies are a  Minor League Baseball team based in Kodak, Tennessee, a suburb of Knoxville. The team, which plays in the Southern League, is the Double-A affiliate of the Chicago Cubs. They play at Smokies Stadium, directly off Interstate 40 at Exit 407, which seats up to 8,000 fans. The team was based in Knoxville and called the Knoxville Smokies among other names for many years before moving to Kodak and changing its name prior to the 2000 season. The team's nickname refers to the Great Smoky Mountains mountain range which permeates the region; mountains in the chain are often clouded in a hazy mist that may appear as smoke rising from the forest. The team plans to move into a new facility in Knoxville beginning in the 2025 season.

History

Prior professional baseball in Knoxville
Knoxville has hosted Minor League Baseball teams since the late 19th century. The city's professional baseball history dates back to 1896 with the formation of the Knoxville Indians who played two seasons in the Southeastern League. They were followed by the Knoxville Reds (1902–1905). In 1904, the Reds won the city's first professional championship in the Tennessee–Alabama League. The Knoxville Appalachians began play in 1909 as members of the original Class B South Atlantic League. They dropped out of the "Sally League" that season, but continued in the Class D Southeastern League (1910) and Appalachian League (1911–1914). The Appalachians adopted the Reds moniker from the previous Knoxville team in 1912.

The club returned to the South Atlantic loop, now Class B, as the Smokies from 1925 to 1929. On July 22, 1931, the Mobile Bears franchise of the A1 Southern Association moved to Knoxville and played as the Smokies through July 5, 1944, when the club returned to Mobile. The transfer marked the end of Knoxville's membership in the Southern Association.

In 1946, the Smokies joined the Class B Tri-State League and played in it until the loop folded in 1955. But in July 1956, when the Montgomery Rebels of the Class A South Atlantic League needed a new home, they transferred to Knoxville. The Smokies' manager that season was Earl Weaver who was elected to the Baseball Hall of Fame in 1996.

Double-A

The Smokies were reclassified as Double-A with the rest of the Sally League in 1963, and were charter members of the Sally's successor, the Southern League, in 1964. Apart from a four-year (1968–1971) hiatus, they have continued in the Southern loop ever since.

Knoxville returned in 1972 as the Knoxville White Sox or Knox Sox, the Chicago White Sox's Double-A club. They transferred their affiliation to the Toronto Blue Jays in 1980, a link that lasted until 1999. For the first 13 of those years, the team was officially known as the Knoxville Blue Jays, or locally referred to as simply the K-Jays. The historic Smokies moniker was reintroduced beginning in the 1993 season.

From 1954 to 1999, Knoxville baseball teams played in Bill Meyer Stadium, formerly known as Knoxville Municipal Stadium, on Don Ridley Field. The stadium was named for Knoxville native son and former Pittsburgh Pirates manager Billy Meyer.

From 1999 to 2005, the Smokies were the Double-A affiliate of the St. Louis Cardinals. However, when the Cardinals purchased the El Paso Diablos, which had been the Arizona Diamondbacks' Double-A affiliate, the Diamondbacks retained the Smokies as their new Double-A affiliate. On September 21, 2006, the Chicago Cubs, who had previously had a Double-A affiliation with division rival West Tenn Diamond Jaxx, reached a two-year player development contract with the Smokies through the 2008 season.

Chicago Cubs (2007–present)

In December 2008, Hall of Famer and former Chicago Cubs All-Star second baseman Ryne Sandberg was named manager for the 2009 season. Sandberg led the Smokies to a second-half Southern League North Division crown and a 3–1 divisional playoff series win over the Huntsville Stars. The Smokies would eventually fall 3-games-to-1 to the Jacksonville Suns for the 2009 Southern League Championship.

In June 2013, the then-Smokies' ownership group, led by Cleveland Browns owner Jimmy Haslam, sold the team to Randy Boyd, a local Knoxville businessman. Though a devoted baseball fan, Boyd is not involved in the day-to-day management of the team, delegating those responsibilities to CEO Doug Kirchhofer and General Manager Brian Cox. In 2016, speculation began that Boyd was wanting to move the Smokies back to Knoxville after he had purchased several parcels in downtown Knoxville. Boyd said he had envisioned a baseball stadium on that site, but at that time had no plans to bring the baseball team back to Knoxville until 2025, when the current stadium contract expires.

On July 11, 2014, The Chicago Cubs and Tennessee Smokies announced an extension to their Player Development Contract (PDC) for the maximum possible term of four years. The agreement meant the Smokies were to remain the Cubs' Double-A affiliate through the 2018 season.

On October 22, 2014 the Smokies revealed new logos, colors, and uniforms that reflected their ongoing relationship with the Chicago Cubs organization.

Smokies Stadium experienced its largest crowd ever of 7,958 on May 13, 2017, against the Montgomery Biscuits. The Smokies lost the game 3–1, which was also Star Wars Night. The previous attendance record was the 7,866 on July 24, 2015, against the Chattanooga Lookouts. The Smokies won the game 8–4, which was also Toy Story Night and Daddy-Daughter Date Night.

In conjunction with Major League Baseball's restructuring of Minor League Baseball in 2021, the Smokies were organized into the Double-A South. In 2022, the Double-A South became known as the Southern League, the name historically used by the regional circuit prior to the 2021 reorganization.

In 2021, Tennessee Smokies owner Randy Boyd announced that the team would be moving back to Knoxville in a new stadium built in the Old City neighborhood, with the plans to play at the new stadium in 2024. It was announced the team would revive its former name of the Knoxville Smokies upon the move.

The 2022 Smokies qualified for the Southern League playoffs by virtue of having the second-best full-season record in the Northern Division behind the Rocket City Trash Pandas, who won both halves of the season. Tennessee defeated Rocket City, 2–1, to win the Northern Division title and advance to the finals against the Pensacola Blue Wahoos.

Season-by-season results

* Due to Hurricane Ivan, the finals series was cancelled. Tennessee and Mobile were declared co-champions.

Pre-2000 playoff results
1999: Lost to Orlando 3–1 in semifinals.
1998: Lost to Jacksonville 3–0 in semifinals.
1997: Lost to Greenville 3–1 in semifinals.
1993: Defeated Greenville 3–2 in semifinals; lost to Birmingham 3–1 in finals.
1991: Lost to Birmingham 3–0 in semifinals.
1986: Lost to Huntsville 3–1 in semifinals.
1985: Lost to Huntsville 3–1 in semifinals.
1984: Defeated Nashville 3–1 in semifinals; lost to Charlotte 3–0 in championship.
1982: Lost to Nashville 3–1 in first round.
1978: Defeated Savannah 2–1 to win league championship.
1974: Defeated Jacksonville 3–2 to win league championship.

Television and radio
All Tennessee Smokies games are shown live on MiLB.TV. The current voice of the Smokies is Mick Gillispie. The secondary broadcaster is Andy Brock. The pre and postgame shows are hosted by Jackson Williams and Joseph Bonanno. All games are also broadcast on 99.1 The Sports Animal and AM 990 (WNML) in Knoxville. Bear Trax is a weekly television show hosted by Mick Gillispie and Charlie Walter about the Smokies and airs at 11pm ET on WTNZ Fox43.

Roster

Notable alumni

 Rick Ankiel
 Carmen Cali
 Stephen Drew
 Scott Effross 
 Joe Girardi
 Shawn Green
 Roy Halladay
 Dan Haren
 Dan Uggla
 David Wells
 Vernon Wells
 Jeff Kent
 Jake Fox
 Orlando Hudson
 Mark Reynolds
 Anthony Reyes
 Kerry Wood
 Miguel Montero
 Yadier Molina
 Jake Fox
 Sam Fuld
 Jeff Samardzija
 Cristian Guzmán
 Chris Carpenter
 Carlos Delgado
 Felipe López
 Jayson Werth
 Casey Blake
 Harold Baines
 Mike Timlin
 Marwin González
 Kelvim Escobar
 Ross Ohlendorf
 Alberto González
 Kevin Cash
 Gabe Gross
 Reed Johnson
 DeWayne Wise
 Micah Owings
 Sean Gallagher
 Kevin Hart
 Carmen Pignatiello
 Brandon Lyon
 DJ LeMahieu
 Dustin Nippert
 Tony Peña
 Doug Slaten
 Bill Murphy
 Starlin Castro
 Tyler Colvin
 Fred McGriff
 Jake Arrieta
 Javier Báez
 Kris Bryant
 Jorge Soler
 Addison Russell
 Kyle Schwarber
 Mitch Webster
 Cecil Fielder
 Harold Baines
 Rusty Kuntz
 Steve Trout
 Fred Manrique
 Kevin Pasley
 Mike Sharperson
 Mark Eichhorn
 Ted Cox
 Paul Hodgson
 Steve Senteney
 Jimmy Key
 Mickey Lolich

References

External links

 Official website

Southern League (1964–present) teams
Sports in Knoxville, Tennessee
Baseball teams established in 2000
Professional baseball teams in Tennessee
Baltimore Orioles minor league affiliates
Chicago Cubs minor league affiliates
Arizona Diamondbacks minor league affiliates
St. Louis Cardinals minor league affiliates
Toronto Blue Jays minor league affiliates
Chicago White Sox minor league affiliates
Cincinnati Reds minor league affiliates
Detroit Tigers minor league affiliates
New York Giants minor league affiliates
Brooklyn Dodgers minor league affiliates
Pittsburgh Pirates minor league affiliates
Boston Bees minor league affiliates
Former Mountain States League (1948–1954) teams
2000 establishments in Tennessee
Jimmy Haslam
South Atlantic League (1904–1963) teams
Double-A South teams